Joseph William Heving (September 2, 1900 – April 11, 1970) was a professional baseball player. Heving played as a pitcher for the New York Giants, Chicago White Sox (1933–34), Cleveland Indians (1937–38 and 1941–44), Boston Red Sox (1938–40) and Boston Braves (1945).

In 1944, Heving led all American League pitchers in appearances with 63, despite being the only grandfather playing in the major leagues. Heving was the oldest player in the American League from 1942 to 1944.

Heving was the brother of catcher Johnnie Heving. He was born and died in Covington, Kentucky.

References

External links

Boston Braves players
Boston Red Sox players
Chicago White Sox players
Cleveland Indians players
New York Giants (NL) players
Major League Baseball pitchers
Baseball players from Kentucky
Sportspeople from Covington, Kentucky
1900 births
1970 deaths
Bartlesville Bearcats players
Topeka Senators players
Asheville Tourists players
Portsmouth Truckers players
Memphis Chickasaws players
Rochester Red Wings players
Indianapolis Indians players
Milwaukee Brewers (minor league) players